Highway 12 is a single carriageway road in the South District of Israel.  It surrounds the mountains of Eilat from the north and west, and it connects Eilat to Highway 10 and Highway 40, which lead toward central Israel. Highway 10 continues north toward the Gaza Strip, whereas Highway 40 proceeds to Beersheba via Mizpe Ramon.

Description of the route from south to north 
Highway 12 begins as an urban boulevard in Eilat exiting the city to the west. It then runs northwest toward the border of Israel with Egypt. Then it turns north past the Netafim Border Crossing and the northern mountains of Eilat.

At Sayarim junction it intersects with Highway 10. It continues northeast past Ovda airport and reaches its north terminus at Shizafon junction, where it intersects with Highway 40.

Junctions (south to north)

See also 

 List of highways in Israel

12